Acropoma heemstrai is a species of fish in the genus Acropoma. A small sample was found in South Africa and Mozambique.

Description 
Its set apart from others due to its luminous gland being shaped like a Y and a distinctive lower jaw that appears somewhat pointed.

References 

Fish described in 2017
heemstrai
Fish of South Africa
Fish of Mozambique